The 2013-14 season was Dundee's first season back in the Scottish Championship after being relegated from the Scottish Premiership, the top flight in Scottish football.

Dundee also competed in the Scottish Cup, the League Cup and the Challenge Cup.

Results and fixtures

Scottish Championship

Scottish League Cup

Scottish Cup

Scottish Challenge Cup

Player statistics 
During the 2013–14 season, Dundee have used 27 players in competitive games. The table below shows the number of appearances and goals scored by each player.

|-
|colspan="10"|Players who left the club during the 2013–14 season
|-

|}

Team statistics

League table

Transfers

In

Out

References 

Dundee F.C. seasons
Dundee